WKBH-FM (102.7 MHz, "102.7 WKBH") is a radio station broadcasting a classic rock and classic hits hybrid format. Licensed to Onalaska, Wisconsin, United States, the station serves the La Crosse area. The station is owned by Magnum Communications, Inc. as of July 31, 2020.

On July 1, 2019, the then-KQEG changed their format from oldies to soft oldies, branded as "102.7 MeTV FM".

On August 1, 2020, KQEG changed their format from soft oldies to classic rock, which moved from WKBH-FM 100.1 (which switched to EMF's K-Love contemporary Christian format). The station began identifying itself as WKBH-FM on August 1, 2020, although the call sign was not officially changed by the Federal Communications Commission until August 11.

Previous logo

References

External links

Radio stations in Wisconsin
Classic rock radio stations in the United States
Radio stations established in 1990
1990 establishments in Wisconsin